The Saskatoon Sirens were a women's football team in the Lingerie Football League (LFL) and played in the 2012 LFL Canada season. Based in Saskatoon, Saskatchewan, the Sirens played their home games at the Credit Union Centre.

The Sirens were one of four teams in the LFL Canada league, after the Toronto Triumph (which played in the main LFL for the 2011–12 season), BC Angels, and the Regina Rage. Because Saskatoon lacks a professional football team of its own, the Sirens' colours were based on those of the Saskatoon Blades, the local team in the Western Hockey League.

The Sirens entered the season ranked last in the league, but the finished first in the league with a 3–1 record and the only team to beat every other team in season play. The Saskatoon Sirens appeared in the first and only LFL Canada Lingerie Bowl, the league's championship game, losing 25–12 to the BC Angels.

The 2013 LFL Canada season was postponed a few weeks prior to the start of the season due to player disputes, league office scheduling, and general lack of team preparation. The LFL Canada never returned.

Rosters

References

External links
 

Legends Football League Canada teams
Sport in Saskatoon
American football teams established in 2012
2012 establishments in Saskatchewan
Women in Saskatchewan